The Madagascar Penguins in a Christmas Caper is a 2005 American computer-animated short film produced by DreamWorks Animation. The 12-minute Madagascar spin-off features the adventures of four penguins, sometimes known as the Madagascar Penguins, who live in the Central Park Zoo and are trained as spies.

The short premiered in theaters on October 7, 2005 with the stop-motion film Wallace & Gromit: The Curse of the Were-Rabbit. It was directed by animation veteran Gary Trousdale, produced by Teresa Cheng, and written by Michael Lachance.

Plot
Focusing on the Madagascar penguins and taking place before the events of the first Madagascar, the youngest penguin on the team, Private, slips out of the zoo on Christmas Eve to find a present for a lonely polar bear named Ted. While roaming the streets of Manhattan, he is captured by Nana (the aggressive elderly lady from the first film and second film) who mistakes him for a chew toy for her vicious dog, Mr Chew. The other three penguins, Skipper, Kowalski, and Rico, rescue Private from Nana's apartment before it is too late. They escalate into chaos against Mr. Chew, all-the-while, not noticed by Nana, who is occupied watching a football game. When they are done, they detonate the door with a stick of dynamite (which Rico had repeatedly attempted to use prior), finally attracting Nana's attention and leaving Mr. Chew to take the fall for what the penguins have done to her place.

At the end of the film they invite Ted to their home. But he has already invited several other guests, resulting in a massive sing-a-long to a parody of Jingle Bells.

Voice cast
Chris Miller as Kowalski.
John DiMaggio as Rico.
Tom McGrath as Skipper.
Elisa Gabrielli as Nana.
Christopher Knights as Private.
Hope Levy as an Additional Voice
Rif Hutton as an Additional Voice.
Richard Miro as an Additional Voice.
Mitch Carter as an Additional Voice.
Lynnanne Zager as an Additional Voice.
Bill Fagerbakke as Ted the polar bear.
Sean Bishop as the Doorman/TV Announcer.
Frank Welker as Mr. Chew.

Soundtrack
The original music for the short was composed by James Dooley. According to Dooley, he was asked to score because he "had written all the music for the penguins in the feature length, Madagascar."

Home media
The Madagascar Penguins in a Christmas Caper was released on later DVD editions of Madagascar, Shrek, and Shrek 2, all of which were released on November 15, 2005. It was released on Blu-ray on September 23, 2008, as a bonus feature attached to Madagascar.

See also
 List of Christmas films

Notes

References

External links

 

2005 films
2005 computer-animated films
2000s American animated films
2000s animated short films
2005 comedy films
American children's animated comedy films
American Christmas films
American computer-animated films
Animated films about penguins
Computer-animated short films
DreamWorks Animation animated short films
Films about animals
Films directed by Gary Trousdale
Films scored by James Dooley
Films set in New York City
Madagascar (franchise)
2000s English-language films